Matthew Edward Flynn (born 10 May 1989) is an English footballer who plays for Curzon Ashton as a defender.

Career
Flynn began his career at Warrington Town, before signing for Macclesfield Town. He had a loan spell at Ashton United. On 13 August 2009 it was announced that he had signed a 1-month loan deal with Rochdale. This was turned into a permanent deal on 27 August 2009 after impressing manager Keith Hill over his first three games. After making 11 appearances in total for Rochdale, he signed for Fleetwood Town in August 2011 and he joined Conference North club Altrincham on a one-month loan on 1 December 2011.

Fleetwood announced his release on 1 May 2012. On 3 June 2012, Flynn signed for Barrow.

References

External links

 Port Online Player Profile

1989 births
Living people
Footballers from Warrington
English footballers
Association football defenders
Macclesfield Town F.C. players
Ashton United F.C. players
Rochdale A.F.C. players
Fleetwood Town F.C. players
Altrincham F.C. players
Barrow A.F.C. players
English Football League players
National League (English football) players
Southport F.C. players
Hyde United F.C. players
Chorley F.C. players